John Nash (1590–1661) was an English merchant and politician who sat in the House of Commons  between 1640 and 1648. He fought on the Parliamentary side in the English Civil War.

Nash was the son or brother of James Nash of Worcester. He was a wealthy clothier and alderman and was Mayor of Worcester in 1633. He was also a Justice of the Peace for the city.

In April 1640, Nash was elected Member of Parliament for Worcester in the Short Parliament. He was re-elected MP for Worcester for the Long Parliament in November 1640. During the Civil War, he commanded a troop of horse in the Parliamentary army. He was on the Assessment Committee for Worcestershire in 1644 and was excluded from parliament under Pride's Purge in 1648.
 
Nash died at the age of 72 and was buried at St Helen's Worcester where there is a monument. He founded the charity known as Nash's Hospital and left charitable legacies for apprentices and for helping young men set up businesses.

References

1590 births
1661 deaths
Members of the Parliament of England for Worcester
Roundheads
Mayors of places in Worcestershire
17th-century English merchants
English MPs 1640 (April)
English MPs 1640–1648
Business people from Worcester, England